Chaung-U Township  is a township in Monywa District of Sagaing Division in Burma. The principal town is Chaung-U.

Neighbourhood townships
The township boundary touches with the boundaries of other townships;Myinmu township is in the east, Myaung township is in the south, Salingyi township is in the west, and Monywa Township is in the north. There is Chindwin river between two townships of Chaung-U and Salingyi as the common boundary.

Inside Township

List of villages
The township has got 74 villages. They are below:

International highway route

Yar Kyi 
Yar Kyi (ယာကြီးကျေးရွာ), also Yar Gyi, Yargyi and Yargi village, is an important stopover on the India–Myanmar–Thailand Trilateral Highway. On 11 April 2018, Yagyi-Kalewa section was finally awarded to Punj Lylloyd, to be completed in 3 years by April 2021 for Rs.1,177 crore in Engineering, procurement, and construction (EPC) mode under a special purpose vehicle. It will be an international standard highway with two-lane in each direction with paved shoulders, entailing 6 truck stops, 20 bus stops and passenger shelters, 1 rest area, strengthening of 4 existing major bridges and 9 existing minor bridges, and construction of 3 new major bridges and 2 new minor bridges.

Chaungma 
Chaungma (also Chaung Ma) village (ချောင်းမကျေးရွာ) is an important stopover on the India–Myanmar–Thailand Trilateral Highway.

Historical Villages in the Township
There are many historical villages, quarters and monasteries around the township. Among them, Nwe Chway, Pè Pyittaw, Khin Mon, Amyint and Hman Cho are the most distinct villages, for instance.

Nwe Chway Village
It is a historical ancient village that is concerned with King Kyansit's history. It was a place where Prince Kyansit saw some creepers as the blessing omen for him. When he became a king, he founded the village. He called it "Nwe Chway village"; and also built the pagodas.

Pè Pyittaw Village
It is also a village where was founded and named by King Kyansit. There are still historical pagodas in the village.

Amyint Village
It is a historical ancient village. Ago, it was a city when Innwa and Konbaung dynasties governed the country. During the age of Innwa, it was an important city for Innwa Kings and their armies. King Swar Saw Kè was the governor of the city before he became a king. When Kone Baung Kings governed the country, the mayor Min Lappha Wah was famous. Venerable Abbot Ven. Nandar Siri was also born in the village. Amyint has many historical ancient pagodas, monasteries and other proofs or things.

Historical Urban Quarters
There are many historical urban quarters in the town. For instance, Sandaw Sware, A Shaema Oak, A Naukma Oak and Ye Hlay quarters are the most distinct historical urban quarters. They were historically concerned with King Kyansit.

Historical Monasteries
Around the township, there are many historical ancient monasteries and pagodas. In the urban quarters, there are ancient pagodas that were built by King Kyansit. For example, Vin Khaya (Win Kha Ya) Pagoda in Makyi Taw Monastery and Htee Hlaing Shin Pagoda in Htee Hlaing Shin Monastery are those pagodas that were built by King Kyansit. Many other historical ancient pagodas and monasteries are found spreading around the township.

Popular Places of Attractions
 The Noble Handprint of Lord Buddha and Lattawyar Pagoda in Taw Chaung Lay
 Yadana Shwe Gu Kyi Pagoda in Chaung-U
 Vin kara Pagoda and Makyi Taw monastery in Chaung-U
 Shwe Pyi Thar Pagodas in Chaung-U
 Kyauk Myin Mountain Peak Monastery in the township
 Stone Pagoda and the ninety-nine springs on Nwe Chway Hills
 Shwe Sigon Pagoda and other monasteries in Khinmum
 Pagodas and monasteries in A Myint old city(A Myint village)
 Sin Phyu Shin Bridge
 Nwe Chway Dam
 Pauk Inn Lake

Economy
 Agriculture
 Trades
 Transportation Business
 Courses

References

External links
Maplandia World Gazetteer - map showing the township boundary

Townships of Sagaing Region